"Azathoth" is the beginning of an incomplete novel written by American horror fiction writer H. P. Lovecraft. It was written in June 1922, and published as a fragment in the journal Leaves in 1938, after Lovecraft's death. It is the first piece of fiction to mention the fictional being Azathoth, one of the major entities in Lovecraft's Cthulhu Mythos, though the entity only appears in the title.

Plot
The story begins by describing how the modern world has been stripped of imagination and belief in magic. The protagonist is an unnamed man who lives in a dull and ugly city. Every night for many years the man gazes from his window upon the stars, until he comes over time to observe secret vistas unsuspected by normal humanity. One night the gulf between his world and the stars is bridged, and his mind ascends from his body out unto the boundless cosmos.

Inspiration
Lovecraft described his planned novel as a "weird Eastern tale in the 18th century manner" and as a "weird Vathek-like novel", referring to a novel of Arabia written by William Thomas Beckford in 1786. Suggesting that his story would involve "material of the Arabian Nights type", he wrote that

Though Lovecraft likely never got past the 480-word fragment that survives, he later wrote a novella with a similar theme, The Dream-Quest of Unknown Kadath.

References

External links
 
 

1938 short stories
Short stories by H. P. Lovecraft
Short stories published posthumously
Fantasy short stories
Cthulhu Mythos short stories
Unfinished novels
Works originally published in American magazines